Girdenis is a Lithuanian surname. It evolved from the ancient Lithuanian personal name Girdenis. Notable people with the surname include:

 (1937-2011), linguist, creator of the Lithuanian school of phonology

References

Lithuanian-language surnames